There are several Wikipedia articles which relate to Wembley live shows at the Wembley Arena or Wembley Stadium in Wembley, London

 Wembley live shows (Gladiators)
 Spice Girls Live at Wembley Stadium
 Girls Aloud: Greatest Hits Live From Wembley Arena
 Genesis Live at Wembley Stadium
 Foo Fighters Live at Wembley Stadium
 Wings Over Wembley